This is a survey of the postal history and postage stamps of French Polynesia, formerly known as the French Oceania.

The first postage stamps used in French Polynesia were the general stamps of the French Colonies from 1862.

In 1882 a shortage of 25c stamps necessitated a surcharge on less-used values. Some of the surcharges also included the name "TAHITI". This happened again in 1884 with 5c and 10c values.

Stamps inscribed "Établissements de l’Oceanie" (French Settlements in Oceania) became available in 1892 with the Navigation and Commerce issue.  

In 1893, two kinds of overprint were applied to the remaining stocks of regular and postage due French Colonies stamps; one type was a slanted overprint reading "TAHITI" and the other was a horizontal "1893 / TAHITI". For some values of stamps, very few were left to be overprinted, and genuine overprints are quite rare, the rarest being the horizontal overprint on the 25c yellow at around US$20,000.

In 1903, due to a shortage of 10c stamps, stamps of French Oceania were overprinted "TAHITI" and surcharged with new face values. Stamps of French Oceania also received a red cross and "TAHITI" overprint in 1915 for use as semi-postal stamps.

Stamps since 1958 have been inscribed "French Polynesia".

See also
Postage stamps of the French Colonies

External links
Evert Klaseboer Tahiti pages.
Philatelic Center of French Polynesia
Stamps of the French Oceanic Settlements at iomoon.com

References and sources

References

Sources
 Stanley Gibbons Ltd: various catalogues
 Encyclopaedia of Postal Authorities
Rossiter, Stuart & John Flower. The Stamp Atlas. London: Macdonald, 1986. 

Communications in French Polynesia
French Polynesia